Renowned Films is a London/LA based production company. Producing "mainstream, cut-through, noisy factual, fact-ent, formats, documentaries and branded content with a twist".

Renowned Films has produced hundreds of hours of factual, documentary, format and reality television alongside its branded content division that has worked with clients including Adidas, Selfridges, Apple and Beats by Dre. Renowned's recent projects include 'The Peng Life' with the Chicken Connoisseur for Channel 4, 'NYPD Biggest Gang in New York?' for the BBC, 'The Women Who Kill Lions', 'Top Dad with Ashley Walters' and series 3 of 'Random Acts' for Channel 4, as well as Pranksterz for ITV2 

In 2015, Channel 4 took an equity stake in Renowned Films as part of its £20 million Growth Fund, which has seen the company grow and establish itself as one of the fastest growing indie production companies in the UK.

In 2017 Critical Content acquired an undisclosed stake in Renowned with Channel 4 exiting the business. The partnership saw CEO of Critical Content Tom Forman and EVP / CFO Christoph Pachler joining the board.

References

Channel 4
Television production companies of the United Kingdom